McLuney Creek is a stream in Perry County, Ohio.

McLuney Creek was named for a pioneer who settled there.

See also
List of rivers of Ohio

References

Rivers of Perry County, Ohio
Rivers of Ohio